Sidney Fine (December 25, 1904 – May 20, 2002) was an American orchestrator and television composer.

Career 
Fine started his career, as an orchestrator playing the piano in silent movie theaters.

In 1930s-1950s, Fine moved to Los Angeles, California to study with composer, Arnold Schoenberg.

Fine freelance for many Hollywood studios such as Paramount pictures, MGM, Republic Pictures and Disney.
Fine orchestrated Love Crazy, the Gallop of the Stags from Bambi, Victory Through Air Power, the songs for Blue Skies, Fun and Fancy Free and orchestrated and co-composed Lady’s theme from Lady and the Tramp and also worked on The Mickey Mouse Club television series.

In 1950s-1970s, Fine moved to New York, to arrange for a radio show. He worked on The Jack Benny Program, The George Burns and Gracie Allen Show and The Dinah Shore Show. In 1957, he was nominated for an Primetime Emmy for Best Musical Contribution for Television.

In 1999, Fine worked on a Michael Jackson album Seeing Voices, which was a tribute to Fine's son, who died of a brain disease in 1975.

Death 
Fine died in May 2002 of pneumonia at the Providence Saint Joseph Medical Center in Burbank, California, at the age of 97.

References 

Film Composers in America 1911 - 1970 by Clifford McCarthy

Threads of Melody: The Evolution of a Major Film Score by Ross Care

External links 

1904 births
2002 deaths
American television composers
Deaths from pneumonia in California
People from Waterbury, Connecticut
University of Connecticut alumni
City College of New York alumni